Jacksonville is an unincorporated community in Sullivan County, in the U.S. state of Missouri.

History
A variant name was "Jacksons Corners". A post office called Jackson's Corners was established in 1856, and remained in operation until 1876. Branson Jackson, an early postmaster, gave the community his last name.

References

Unincorporated communities in Sullivan County, Missouri
Unincorporated communities in Missouri